Diplomatic relations between Switzerland and the United States were established in 1853 by the U.S. and in 1868 by Switzerland. The first diplomatic representation of the U.S. was established in Basel in 1853.

History

Consular relations

With the conclusion of the Napoleonic Wars, many Swiss sought a more peaceful and prosperous life in America. A sizable number emigrated to the United States, especially from the cantons of Vaud and Lucerne. As early as 1815, representatives from the two respective cantons had proposed to the Federal Diet that the country establish a consulate in either Philadelphia or New York City to ensure the rights of their merchants and expatriates. The following year the Diet resolved to create a consulate in New York. It was initially decided that their consul would be chosen from the Swiss population in America, but no appointment was ever made. In July 1822, with consultation from Swiss–American diplomat Albert Gallatin, the Diet appointed its first two consuls to the United States: Henry Casimir de Rham of Yverdon-les-Bains, canton of Vaud, a banker and merchant and then-resident of New York; and Antoine Charles Cazenove of Geneva, a wine and tobacco merchant and then-resident of Alexandria, Virginia. Niklaus Rudolf von Wattenwyl, the chairman of the Diet, sent a letter to United States President James Monroe, asking him to grant the appointees an exequatur and emphasizing the liberal and federal characteristics shared by both of their countries' constitutions. The letter marked the first official correspondence between the governments of Switzerland and the United States and established a precedent for the character of relations between them throughout the rest of the 1800s.

The United States granted the exequatur. Gallatin advised the Diet on how to divide the territory to be administered by the two new consuls. De Rham assumed responsibility for a district encompassing the New England states, New York, New Jersey, Pennsylvania, Delaware, and the states north of the Ohio River. Cazenove managed the remainder of the United States. Their main charge was to protect the interests and property of Swiss immigrants and travelers, particularly merchants. Both performed their duties in an honorary capacity outside of their regular business, with de Rham serving until 1842 and Cazenove until 1852. The latter's responsibilities in his later service became increasingly diplomatic.

Switzerland's cotton and silk exports to the United States increased significantly throughout the 1820s, making it more desirable for the latter to establish its own consulate. In 1830, John G. Boker, businessman from New York City and a friend of Chief Clerk of the Department of State Daniel Brent, was appointed to be the first American consul to Switzerland. He arrived that fall in Bern and was warmly received by the chairman of the Diet. While waiting for his commission to be approved by the 22 cantons, Boker moved to Basel, as most Swiss exports to America passed through there. Impatient with the tedious nature of the decentralized government, he opened his consulate in October without official Swiss recognition.

The United States consuls in Switzerland were busy in their early years. Since their income was dependent on duties made on inspected and approved goods, many American consuls were forced to operate their own businesses for extra money, which diverted their attention from their official responsibilities. While they were on business trips, the consulate was left in the care of a vice-consul or agent, usually a hired merchant. In the absence of a consul, one agent briefly relocated the consulate to Zürich in 1843, though it was returned to Basel the following year upon the arrival of the new appointee, Seth T. Otis.

Diplomatic relations
Diplomatic relations were established in 1853 by the U.S. and in 1868 by Switzerland. The first diplomatic representation of the U.S. was established in Basel in 1853.

The U.S. Embassy in Switzerland is in Bern. The U.S. Mission to the European Office of the United Nations and other International Organizations, the U.S. Mission to the WTO, and the U.S. Delegation to the Conference on Disarmament are in Geneva. America Centers and Consular Agencies are also maintained in Zurich and Geneva. The U.S. ambassador to Switzerland is also accredited to Liechtenstein.

The relations entered a tense phase during the World Jewish Congress lawsuit against Swiss banks starting in 1995. 
The American government supported the heirs of the Holocaust victims and the Swiss had to re-evaluate the role of Switzerland during World War II.
One of the steps taken was the publication of the names of the owners of dormant accounts in Swiss banks, with the surprise result that Renee May, deceased in 1970 and the mother of then American ambassador Madeleine Kunin was among the names.

As of January 2021, the U.S. ambassador to Switzerland is temporarily being held by Eva Weigold Schultz, and as of August 2019, the Swiss ambassador to the U.S. is Jacques Pitteloud.

Moreover, Switzerland acts as the protecting power for relations and interests between the U.S. and Iran as the United States severed relations with Iran in 1980, during the Iranian Revolution and the Iran Hostage Crisis.  Between 1963 and 2015, Switzerland acted as the protecting power between Cuba and the United States, until the embassies were re-established in Havana and Washington, D.C.

Switzerland has an embassy in Washington, D.C. and maintains consulates-general in Atlanta, Boston, Chicago, Los Angeles, New York and San Francisco.

At one point the Consulate-General of Switzerland in Houston resided in Suite 1040 of Two Allen Center; the mission closed in 2006.

On 29 March 2021, Swiss Ambassador to the U.S. Jacques Pitteloud was attacked by an unknown intruder at his residence on Cathedral Drive Northwest (attached to the embassy).

Switzerland was the country that hosted the 2021 Russia–United States summit, in Geneva.

In 2022, the Helsinki Commission of the U.S. Congress stated:

Both countries enjoy historically close ties, common interests, shared traditions, and remarkable political similarities as federal unions of independent states with representative democracies.

Bilateral agreements 
The first four years of cooperation under the U.S.-Swiss Joint Economic Commission (JEC) invigorated bilateral ties by recording achievements in a number of areas, including consultations on anti-money laundering efforts, counter-terrorism, and pharmaceutical regulatory cooperation; an e-government conference; and the re-establishment of the Fulbright student/cultural exchange program.

The United States and Switzerland signed three new agreements in 2006 that will complement the JEC. The first of the new agreements is the Enhanced Political Framework and was signed by Under Secretary of State for Political Affairs Nicholas Burns and Swiss State Secretary Michael Ambühl. The second agreement is the Trade and Investment Cooperation Forum and was signed by then-U.S. Trade Representative Rob Portman and then-Economics and Trade Minister Joseph Deiss. The last agreement is the revised Operative Working Arrangement on Law Enforcement Cooperation on Counterterrorism and was signed by U.S. Attorney General Alberto Gonzales and then-Swiss Justice Minister Christoph Blocher.

In February 2013, the Swiss Federal Council allowed for the signing of the Foreign Account Tax Compliance Act (FATCA) with the US. These agreements force all Swiss banks to inform the Internal Revenue Service of undeclared, off-shore accounts. These new regulations will be applicable by 2014, and in turn assure Swiss banks of continued operations within the US.

In July 2015 Switzerland and the United States signed an organic food equivalency agreement; any product certified as organic in one country may be sold as organic in the other.

In July 2019, the US Senate approved the Double Taxation Treaty (DTA) with Switzerland, which was already accepted by Swiss parliament in 2010. The new agreement, applicable to accounts from September 23, 1999 onward, is amending the tax treaty of 1996 and regulates requests for information on financial accounts by US authorities, as well as exemptions for retirement savings by US persons.

Trade

Switzerland’s cumulative direct investment in the U.S. amounts to $300 billion (2020). Swiss companies directly support half-a-million jobs in the United States (2019).

Total exports of U.S. goods amounted to $18.3 billion and services (mostly business services and intellectual property licenses) over $42 billion in 2020. In terms of total trade, the United States is Switzerland’s second largest trading partner, preceded by Germany and followed by China. Total U.S. direct investment in Switzerland was valued at $229 billion (2019). U.S. companies employ approximately 100,000 workers in Switzerland.

The Swiss government plans to buy 36 F-35A fighter aircraft from Lockheed Martin (to replace its aging F/A-18 fleet) and five Patriot surface-to-air missile units from Raytheon for over $8 billion in total (2021).

See also 
 Swiss Americans

References

Sources

External links 

 History of Switzerland - U.S. relations
 Swiss American Historical Society
 Embassy of the United States Bern,  Switzerland at Google Cultural Institute
U.S. Relations With Switzerland - U.S. Department of State
Switzerland-United States bilateral relations - Swiss federal administration

 
Bilateral relations of the United States
United States